The Prince Albert Grand Council (PAGC) is a Tribal Council representing the band governments of twelve First Nations  in the province of Saskatchewan. Its head offices are located in the city of Prince Albert. The Tribal Council was created in 1977 and is one of the largest in Canada.

Demographics
As of March 2013 there were 38,832 registered members in the 12 First Nation bands.

Members
 Wahpeton Dakota Nation with offices in Redwing. Registered members: 500 
 Sturgeon Lake First Nation with offices in Shellbrook. Registered members: 2,756 
 James Smith Cree Nation with offices in Melfort. Registered members: 3,239 
 Montreal Lake Cree Nation with offices in Montreal Lake. Registered members: 3,678 
 Lac La Ronge Indian Band with offices in La Ronge. Registered members: 9,765 
 Peter Ballantyne Cree Nation with offices in Pelican Narrows. Registered members: 9,394 
 Cumberland House Cree Nation with offices in Cumberland House. Registered members: 1,387 
 
 Shoal Lake Cree Nation with offices in Pakwaw Lake. Registered members: 919 
 Red Earth Cree Nation with offices in Prince Albert. Registered members: 1,602 
 Hatchet Lake Dene Nation with offices in Wollaston Lake. Registered members: 1,685 
 Black Lake Denesuline First Nation with offices in Black Lake. Registered members: 2,039 
 Fond du Lac Dene Nation with offices in Fond du Lac. Registered members: 1,867

References

External links
 Official website

First Nations tribal councils
First Nations governments in Saskatchewan
Prince Albert, Saskatchewan